CGC may stand for:

Companies
 Computer generated character
 Co-operative Grocer Chain Japan, known as CGC Japan
 Cambridge Gliding Centre
 Canada Games Centre
 Canada Games Company
 Canopy Growth Corporation, medical marijuana company in Smiths Falls, Ontario
 Capital Group Companies, an investment management organization
 Certified Guaranty Company, a grading service for the comic book collecting industry
 CGCOC Group, a Chinese construction company
 China Geo-Engineering Corporation

Science
 Cerebellar granule cell
 Constrained geometry complex, a kind of catalyst
 Color-glass condensate, a type of matter theorized to exist in atomic nuclei traveling near the speed of light
 DARPA's Cyber Grand Challenge, a competition among completely-automatic hacking systems
 CGC, a codon for the amino acid arginine

Other
 Chen Guangcheng, also known as the "Blind Lawyer", is a Chinese civil rights activist
 Commonwealth Grants Commission
 Consumer generated content, also known as Consumer generated media
 Canine Good Citizen, certification
 Conspicuous Gallantry Cross, a military decoration of the British Armed Forces
 United States Coast Guard Cutter
 Certified general contractor, a type of unlimited contractor in Florida as opposed to registered (limited)
 Board-Certified Genetic Counselor
 Camparini Gioielli Cup, a professional tennis tournament
 CB Gran Canaria, professional basketball club based in Las Palmas, Spain